Unblackened  is a live acoustic album by American heavy metal band Black Label Society. It was recorded live on March 6, 2013, at Club Nokia in Los Angeles, and released on September 24, 2013.

Disc 1 consists of live tracks and disc 2 also consists of live tracks among six newly recorded songs, three of which are re-recordings of previously released songs from the band's studio albums.

The album was announced back in 2012, but the release was delayed due to the postponement of the show, which was settled to be recorded in August. Black Label Society started the pre-ordering of the album in August 2013, also offering a deluxe edition box set containing a double live CD pack, a DVD of the show, a replica of Zakk Wylde's pewter dagger necklace, a photo book with photos taken from the show, and a custom package.

On August 9, 2013, "Ain't No Sunshine When She's Gone" was released as a single through iTunes on North America.

Track listing

Personnel
Zakk Wylde – vocals, guitar, piano. acoustic guitar on studio tracks
Nick Catanese – guitar 
John DeServio – bass, additional vocals
Derek Sherinian  – piano
Chad Szeliga – drums
Greg Locascio – additional vocals

Charts

References

Black Label Society albums
2013 live albums
E1 Music albums